Rafik Boulaïnceur (born 11 December 1991) is an Algerian football player who currently plays for NRB Teleghma in the Algerian Ligue 2.

References

External links
 
Rafik Boulaïnceur profile at 

1991 births
Living people
Algerian footballers
Algeria under-23 international footballers
JSM Béjaïa players
CA Batna players
Algerian Ligue Professionnelle 1 players
Association football forwards
21st-century Algerian people